Altunoluk is a Turkish surname. Notable people with the surname include:

 Sevda Altunoluk (born 1994), Turkish Paralympian goalball player
 Sevtap Altunoluk (born 1995), Turkish Paralympian goalball player

Turkish-language surnames